The Mark 25 torpedo was an aircraft-launched anti-surface ship torpedo designed by the Division of War Research of Columbia University in 1943 as a replacement for the Mark 13 torpedo.

It was designed for higher speed, greater strength and more ease of manufacture compared to the Mark 13. Naval Ordnance Station Forest Park built twenty-five units in 1946 for test and evaluation, however, this torpedo was never mass-produced due to the large inventory of Mark 13s left over at the end of World War II. Moreover, the role of Naval aircraft changed from a torpedo strike platform to an antisubmarine warfare platform.

References

Torpedoes
Torpedoes of the United States
Unmanned underwater vehicles